The globose nucleus is one of the deep cerebellar nuclei. It is located medial to the emboliform nucleus and lateral to the fastigial nucleus. This nucleus contains primarily large and small multipolar neurons.

The globose nucleus and emboliform nucleus are occasionally referred to collectively as the interposed nucleus.

References

External links
 https://web.archive.org/web/20150621011739/http://www.mona.uwi.edu/fpas/courses/physiology/neurophysiology/Cerebellum.htm
 https://web.archive.org/web/20080405060224/http://www.lib.mcg.edu/edu/eshuphysio/program/section8/8ch6/s8ch6_30.htm
 NIF Search - Globose Nucleus via the Neuroscience Information Framework

Cerebellum